The Accrediting Agency of Chartered Colleges and Universities in the Philippines is a non-profit and non-stock accreditation organization in the Philippines.

The agency has 111 institutional members and in the 20 years to 2012 provided accreditation for almost 3000 programs.

References

1987 establishments in the Philippines
Higher education in the Philippines
Educational organizations based in the Philippines
School accreditors